Shaun O'Brien (born 1996) is an Irish hurler who plays for Waterford SHC club De La Salle and at inter-county level with the Waterford senior hurling team. He usually lines out as a goalkeeper.

Career

O'Brien first played hurling at juvenile and underage levels with the De La Salle club in Waterford, before progressing to the club's senior team. He lined out in goal when De La Salle were beaten by Ballygunner in the 2019 Waterford SHC final. O'Brien never played in the minor or under-21 grades with Waterford but was drafted onto the senior team during the pre-season Munster League in 2020. He became Waterford's first choice goalkeeper during the 2021 season. O'Brien's inter-county honours include a National Hurling League title in 2022.

Career statistics

Honours

Waterford
National Hurling League: 2022

References

1996 births
Living people
De La Salle hurlers
Waterford inter-county hurlers
Hurling goalkeepers